Andrewsarchus is an extinct genus of mammal that lived during the middle Eocene epoch in what is now Inner Mongolia, China. Only one species is usually recognized, A. mongoliensis, known from a single skull of great size discovered in 1923 during the expeditions to Central Asia by the American Museum of Natural History (AMNH). Generally classified as a mesonychid since its original description, most recent studies classify it as an artiodactyl. One study specifically classifies Andrewsarchus as a member of the clade Cetancodontamorpha, closely related to entelodonts, hippos and cetaceans (members of the infraorder that includes the whales).

Taxonomy 

The only known skull was found at a locality in the lower levels of the middle Eocene Irdin Manha Formation of Inner Mongolia, by the paleontological assistant Kan Chuen Pao during the spring of the second year (1923) of the Central Asiatic Expeditions (CAE) of the AMNH, led by the explorer and naturalist Roy Chapman Andrews. The skull is now on display at the American Museum of Natural History in New York.

The genus name was dedicated to Andrews by Henry Fairfield Osborn, and it derives from the surname "Andrews" +   ('leader', 'chief' or 'commander'). The species epithet mongoliensis refers to Inner Mongolia, the region where the type material was found.

It was classified in the clade Mesonychia due to the similarity in structure between its teeth and skull with those of other mesonychid species known from complete skeletons; however, much of this was based only on Osborn's original publication, and more recent studies have found it to have no special mesonychid affinities, instead grouping it with various artiodactyl clades. Indeed, one study (Spaulding et al., 2009) has not only found them to be closer to entelodonts, but as kin to Whippomorpha in the clade Cetacodontamorpha.

Below is a cladogram by Spaulding et al (2009):

A possible synonym of Andrewsarchus was Paratriisodon, which was described in 1959 on the basis of a lower jaw fragment about 34 cm long and some upper jaw and tooth remains from the Upper Eocene Lushih Formation in the Chinese Henan Province, and whose reconstructed size resembles that of Andrewsarchus. The original describer of Paratriisodon considered it to be a representative of the Arctocyonidae.

Description

Osborn (1924) declared Andrewsarchus as the largest terrestrial mammalian carnivore known on the basis of the length of the skull, which he used to estimate its size by comparing it to the mesonychid Mesonyx. However, since the known morphology of Andrewsarchus is entelodont-like and consequently very different from mesonychids in habits and likely in body proportions, according to Szalay and Gould (1966) if a size estimate has to be made it would be more appropriate to follow the proportions of entelodonts.

The orbits of the eyes are set low and widely separated from one another by the snout, the sagittal crest is small, and the articulation for the mandible is shallow.

Andrewsarchus mongoliensis has a complete placental tooth formula with 3 incisors, 1 canine, 4 premolars and 3 molars in each side of the jaws, as in entelodonts. The incisors are arranged in a semicircular configuration, the second and third premolars are elongated and single-cusped, the crowns of the molars are heavily wrinkled, and the first and second molars are much more heavily worn than the precedent and subsequent teeth. In fact, the molars are so similar to those of entelodonts it has been suggested that had they been found in isolation, they would have been classified as such. There are also greatly enlarged second incisors, as big as the canines, which despite not being preserved can be estimated from the diameter of their tooth sockets. They were proportionally small compared to the whole dentition and the size of the skull according to Szalay and Gould, contrary to Osborn's description.

References

Cetancodontamorpha
Eocene even-toed ungulates
Mammal enigmatic taxa
Eocene mammals of Asia
Lutetian genus first appearances
Priabonian genus extinctions
Fossil taxa described in 1924
Taxa named by Henry Fairfield Osborn
Prehistoric even-toed ungulate genera